Everything Happens to Me is a 1938 British comedy film directed by Roy William Neill and starring Max Miller, Chili Bouchier and H. F. Maltby. It was made at Teddington Studios by the British subsidiary of Warner Brothers The film's sets were designed by the art directors Peter Proud and Michael Relph.

Synopsis
The film features Miller as a vacuum-cleaner salesman volunteering as an election agent to canvas on behalf of prospective candidate Arthur Gusty (Maltby). However, when he learns from nurse Sally Green (Bouchier) that Gusty is a crook who has been systematically siphoning off funds from the local orphanage into his own pocket, he withdraws his support and throws himself whole-heartedly behind the campaign of Gusty's honourable opponent Norman Prodder (Frederick Burtwell).

Cast
 Max Miller as Charles Cromwell
 Chili Bouchier as Sally Green
 H. F. Maltby as Arthur Gusty
 Frederick Burtwell as Norman Prodder
 Norma Varden as Mrs. Prodder
 Allan Jeayes as Bill Johnson
 Winifred Izard as Mrs. Gusty
 Hal Walters as Jack

The title song and another within the film were written by Fred Godfrey.

Bibliography
 Low, Rachael. Filmmaking in 1930s Britain. George Allen & Unwin, 1985.
 Wood, Linda. British Films, 1927-1939. British Film Institute, 1986.

External links
 
 Everything Happens to Me at BFI Film & TV Database
 Miller's Movies at Max Miller information site

1938 films
1938 comedy films
British comedy films
Films directed by Roy William Neill
British black-and-white films
Films set in England
Films shot at Teddington Studios
Warner Bros. films
1930s English-language films
1930s British films